North Baltimore is a village in Wood County, Ohio, United States and is part of the Toledo, OH Metropolitan Statistical Area. The population was 3,432 at the 2010 census. The village is a member of the Toledo Metropolitan Area Council of Governments.

History
North Baltimore was platted in 1874 when the Baltimore and Ohio Railroad was extended to that point. A post office called North Baltimore has been in operation since 1874. The village was incorporated in 1876.

A September 26, 1986 industrial incident in North Baltimore lead to fumes hospitalizing 89 people.

Geography

Interstate 75 and Ohio State Route 18 meet at the village, while it is about three miles south of Ohio State Route 25 and 26 miles south of Interstate 80/Interstate 90 (Ohio Turnpike).

North Baltimore is also linked to Bowling Green via a 13-mile bike route called the Slippery Elm Trail, with East Broadway Street in North Baltimore on the south end and Sand Ridge Road in Bowling Green on the north end.

Ironically, North Baltimore is not adjacent to Baltimore, Ohio, a village in Fairfield County approximately 25 miles east of Columbus. North Baltimore and Baltimore are actually approximately 140 miles from each other.

North Baltimore is part of the Toledo, OH Metropolitan Statistical Area and lies within the Toledo Media Market.

The village is home to the North Baltimore Local School District.

Demographics

2010 census
As of the census of 2010, there were 3,432 people, 1,317 households, and 880 families living in the village. The racial makeup of the village was 96.3% White, 0.6% African American, 0.2% Native American, 0.4% Asian, 1.2% from other races, and 1.3% from two or more races. Hispanic or Latino of any race were 4.8% of the population.

There were 1,317 households, of which 37.2% had children under the age of 18 living with them, 46.5% were married couples living together, 13.9% had a female householder with no husband present, 6.5% had a male householder with no wife present, and 33.2% were non-families. 27.4% of all households were made up of individuals, and 12.4% had someone living alone who was 65 years of age or older. The average household size was 2.56 and the average family size was 3.09.

The median age in the village was 36.4 years. 26.9% of residents were under the age of 18; 9.1% were between the ages of 18 and 24; 26% were from 25 to 44; 24.2% were from 45 to 64; and 13.9% were 65 years of age or older. The gender makeup of the village was 48.8% male and 51.2% female.

2000 census
As of the census of 2000, there were 3,361 people, 1,272 households, and 886 families living in the village. The population density was 1,512.2 people per square mile (584.5/km2). There were 1,360 housing units at an average density of 611.9 per square mile (236.5/km2). The racial makeup of the village was 96.82% White, 0.36% Native American, 0.39% Asian, 1.13% from other races, and 1.31% from two or more races. Hispanic or Latino of any race were 3.33% of the population.

There were 1,272 households, out of which 36.0% had children under the age of 18 living with them, 50.9% were married couples living together, 14.2% had a female householder with no husband present, and 30.3% were non-families. 25.3% of all households were made up of individuals, and 12.7% had someone living alone who was 65 years of age or older. The average household size was 2.57 and the average family size was 3.07.

In the village, the population was spread out, with 28.2% under the age of 18, 8.8% from 18 to 24, 28.1% from 25 to 44, 19.7% from 45 to 64, and 15.2% who were 65 years of age or older. The median age was 34 years. For every 100 females there were 91.0 males. For every 100 females age 18 and over, there were 86.0 males.

The median income for a household in the village was $38,507, and the median income for a family was $45,962. Males had a median income of $33,144 versus $23,022 for females. The per capita income for the village was $16,894. About 6.9% of families and 8.8% of the population were below the poverty line, including 10.5% of those under age 18 and 11.8% of those age 65 or over.

Notable people
 Russell Coffey, once the oldest living American veteran of World War I
 Gene Sharp, political science professor, nominated for the Nobel Peace Prize

References

External links
Village website
North Baltimore Area Chamber of Commerce
The NBXpress, local news

Villages in Wood County, Ohio
Villages in Ohio